The Odisha State Budget for 2015–2016 was presented by Finance Minister of Odisha, Pradip Kumar Amat on 16 February 2015 in Odisha Legislative Assembly. Finance Minister Pradip Kumar Amat presented the Odisha Annual State Budget of  84,487.77 Crore with total revenue expenditure estimated at  65,838.99.

Budgets

Budget Estimates
 Total Plan Outlay -  84,487.77 Crore
 Non-Plan Expenditure -  43,956.32 Crore
 Planning Expenditure -  44,150 Crore
 Government Expenses -  40,150 Crore
 General Enterprises -  4,000 Crore
 Revenue Collection -  70,940 Crore
 Revenue Surplus -  5,101.51 Crore
 Total Revenue Expenditure -  65,838.99 Crore
 Fiscal Deficit -  10,400 Crore (2.99% of GSDP)

Special Budgets

Nabakalebara 
 Nabakalebara Expenses -  20 Crore
 Tourism Police -  3 Crore
 Jagannath Temple, Odisha –  5 Crore
 Uninterrupted Power Supply to Puri -  67 Crore
 Free Travel from Malatipatna to Puri -  40 Lakh.

Others 
 Biju Krushak Kalyan Yojana -  90 Crore
 Corpus Fund for Fertilizer -  100 Crore
 Disaster Prevention Power Mechanism in Bhubaneswar -  50 Crore
 Jal Nidhi Yojana -  160 Crore
 Modernisation of Odisha Police Force -  120 Crore
 Puri Nabakalebar Festival 2015 -  20.5 Crore
 Odisha Potato Mission -  50 Crore
 Odisha Tourism Police -  3 Crore
 Power Infrastructure in Puri -  67 Crore
 Power Restoration in Berhampur, Gopalpur -  210 Crore
 Power Sector -  1,187.20 Crore
 Re 1 Rice Scheme -  1,402.99 Crore 
 Udyan Krushi Yojana -  128 Crore

Agriculture and Allied Sectors
 Finance Minister of Odisha, Pradip Kumar Amat presented the budget for agriculture and allied sectors with a plan outlay of  10,903.62 Crore.

Healthcare Sector
 Finance Minister of Odisha, Pradip Kumar Amat presented the budget for Healthcare Sector with a plan outlay of  3,855 Crore.

Higher Education
 Finance Minister of Odisha, Pradip Kumar Amat presented the budget for Higher Education with a plan outlay of  1,989.11 Crore.

School and Mass Education
 Finance Minister of Odisha, Pradip Kumar Amat presented the budget for School and Mass Education with a plan outlay of  9979.49 Crore.

Women & Child Welfare
 Finance Minister of Odisha, Pradip Kumar Amat presented the budget for Women & Child Welfare with a plan outlay of  4,160 Crore.

Budget 2015–16: Pradip Kumar Amat
 "Total non-plan expenditure is estimated at Rs 43,956.32 crore in 2015–16, while state's annual plan outlay has been fixed at Rs 44,150 crore." 
 "This is the largest allocation among all departments and constitutes about 12 per cent of the total budgetary allocation."

See also
 Odisha
 Economy of Odisha

References

Odisha Budget 2015–16: Key Highlights <http://www.odishanewsinsight.com/odisha/odisha-budget-2015-16-key-highlights/>

Odisha
Economy of Odisha
State budgets of India